Adventure Park is Victoria's biggest water theme park. The park offers many rides and attractions such as water slides, water playgrounds, action rides and family rides. The park was the first water park in Victoria, though has since also installed dry theme park attractions, such as a Crazy Coaster and a Ferris wheel.

Attractions

Current Attractions

Former Attractions

References

External links

Tourist attractions in Geelong
Amusement parks in Victoria (Australia)